Ukraine were one of the twenty-four participating countries and regions competing in the first Turkvision that took place between 17 and 21 December 2013.

History

2013
Ukraine made their debut in the Turkvision Song Contest at the  contest, in Eskişehir, Turkey. Fazile Ibraimova was selected internally to represent Ukraine in Turkey, she sang "Elmalim". Crimea Media Production was in charge of Ukrainian participation in the 2013 contest. After the contest it emerged that Fazile had performed a song previously released by another artist.

2014
On 30 September 2014 Ukraine confirmed their participation in the 2014 contest. The broadcaster in charge of Ukrainian participation in 2014 changed to ODTRK Odessa. On 6 November 2014, Natali Deniz was announced as the Ukrainian participant, she is part of the Gagauz minority in Ukraine, it was announced on 16 November 2014 she would sing "Sän Benim".

Ukraine's 2015 participation was confirmed on 20 February 2015.

2020
After originally being slated to represent Ukraine with the same song in 2016, Ukrainian Gagauz singer Natalie Papazoglu competed at the 2020 contest with the song "Tikenli yol." She performed 15th on the night of the contest, following  and preceding . As it turned out, the wait was worth it: Ukraine won the competition with 226 points, scoring Ukraine's first ever Turkvision victory.

Participation overview

See also 
 Ukraine in the Eurovision Dance Contest
 Ukraine in the Eurovision Song Contest
 Ukraine in the Junior Eurovision Song Contest

References 

Turkvision
Countries in the Turkvision Song Contest